TreeHouse Foods Inc. is a multinational food processing company specializing in producing private label packaged foods headquartered in Oak Brook, Illinois. Created in 2005 and consisting entirely of acquisitions, in 2010 the company had sales of $2 billion and employed over 4,000 people at 20 facilities. Food Processing magazine named TreeHouse Foods their 2010 Processor of the Year, calling them "the biggest company you never heard of". In 2015, the company was the 37th-largest food and beverage company in North America. In 2018, TreeHouse Foods was ranked No. 446 on the Fortune 500 list. In 2020, it dropped to No. 552 into the Fortune 1000 list.

History 
In 2005, Dean Specialty Foods was spun off from Dean Foods as Bay Valley Foods, LLC, a division of TreeHouse Foods, Inc. In June of that year, TreeHouse Foods started trading on the New York Stock Exchange with a ticker of THS.

Michelle Obama was a member of the board of directors from 2005 through 2007.

Acquisitions and subsidiaries 

2006: Acquired the soup business of Del Monte Foods Company.
2007: Acquired the salsa and picante business of San Antonio Farms, acquired jam, jelly, syrup and pie-filling (both brand name and private-label) producer E.D. Smith, founded by the Canadian politician E.D. Smith
2010: Acquired Sturm Foods and S.T. Specialty Foods
2013: Acquired Naturally Fresh, Inc., Cains Foods,  and Associated Brands
2014: Made a bid to acquire Michael Foods Group Inc

In April 2014, TreeHouse acquired private-label soup and gravy maker Protenergy Natural Foods from Whitecastle Investments.
In June 2014, TreeHouse announced that it was buying Minnesota-based Flagstone Foods for $860 million as a way to gain access to the growing healthy snacks category. The company said the acquisition would push its annual turnover towards $3.5 billion.
2016: Acquired Ralcorp, the ConAgra Foods private-brand business division, for $2.7B.
2020: Acquired majority of Ebro's Riviana Foods U.S. branded pasta business for $242.5 million in cash. The acquisition included the following regional pasta brands: Skinner, No Yolks, American Beauty, Creamette, San Giorgio, Prince and Light 'n Fluffy, Mrs. Weiss', New Mill, P&R Procino-Rossi and Wacky Mac, as well as the St. Louis manufacturing facility, which employs approximately 90 people.

Sturm Foods

Sturm Foods is a subsidiary company that manufactures dry groceries under private label brands and distributes them to the  foodservice industry and grocery suppliers throughout the world. Sturm Foods' origin was a dairy farm operation begun in 1905 by Arthur Sturm and his four sons. The boys began buying eggs from local farmers and shipping them to relatives in Chicago for sale there. This small business eventually expanded into other commodities during the 1930s, such as sugar, seed, twine, potatoes, flour, coal and gasoline. World War II helped increase the business, at that point known as A. Sturm & Sons. The company began manufacturing for the first time bulk amounts of dried food products, such as eggs and powdered milk, to be delivered to American servicemen on the battle fronts. The company entered the private label distribution market in the early 1970s and continues this business model to the current day. The business flourished throughout the eighties and nineties with a broadening product line and employment increasing from 150 to 500 employees. In May 2005, Sturm Foods was acquired by the LLC and private equity firm HM Capital Partners.

On December 1, 2009, HM Capital announced that Sturm Foods was sold to Treehouse Foods for approximately $660 million. The purchase price was made up of $400m in new debt issuance, $100m in equity stock, with the remainder funded by TreeHouse's existing revolving credit facility. With this purchase, the US soup-to-salad dressings firm made a move to further expand its dry grocery offerings. For the 12 months leading to September 30, 2009, Sturm generated sales of $340m. Following the acquisition, TreeHouse has estimated that it will have pro-forma sales of around $1.9bn and adjusted EBITDA of over $275m. The company also expects the transaction to be more than 16% accretive on an annualised basis following the acquisition, adding $0.38 to $0.40 in earnings per share.

Business model 
The company's primary business strategy is to acquire producers of private-label products in Canada and the U.S. It services both the retail grocery and the foodservice distribution channels.
In addition to private-brand non-dairy creamers, single-serving coffee pods, baby foods, salad dressings, marinades, dips, soups, sauces, dry-mix pasta dinners, jams, spreads, and cereals, the company also maintains several brand-name products including Cremora non-dairy coffee lightener, Second Nature egg substitutes, and Nature's Goodness baby foods.

References

External links 

 Consumer/Corporate Splash page

Food manufacturers of the United States
Food and drink companies based in Illinois
Holding companies of the United States
Multinational companies headquartered in the United States
Companies based in DuPage County, Illinois
Oak Brook, Illinois
American companies established in 2005
Food and drink companies established in 2005
Holding companies established in 2005
2005 establishments in Illinois
Companies listed on the New York Stock Exchange
2005 initial public offerings
Corporate spin-offs